Alvin and the Chipmunks is a 2007 American live-action/computer-animated jukebox musical comedy film directed by Tim Hill. Based on the characters of the same name created by Ross Bagdasarian Sr., the film stars Jason Lee, David Cross and Cameron Richardson, while Justin Long, Matthew Gray Gubler and Jesse McCartney voice the titular Chipmunks. The film follows the Chipmunks (Alvin, Simon, and Theodore) who move in with struggling songwriter Dave Seville after they lose their home. When Dave discovers they have rare singing talent, he has them perform in front of JETT Records executive Ian Hawke, who then plans to trick them into living with him to profit off their success with a world tour.

It was released worldwide on December 14, and it was produced by Fox 2000 Pictures, Regency Enterprises and Bagdasarian Productions. It received generally negative reviews from critics. The Rotten Tomatoes consensus criticizes the film's humor and "rehashed kids' movie formula". Alvin and the Chipmunks grossed $361 million worldwide on a budget of $60 million and was the seventh-best-selling DVD of 2008.

Alvin and the Chipmunks is the first live-action/animated film starring Alvin and the Chipmunks since Little Alvin and the Mini-Munks was released in 2003, as that film features puppetry used for the Chipmunks and this film features CGI used for them. The film was followed by three sequels: Alvin and the Chipmunks: The Squeakquel (2009), Alvin and the Chipmunks: Chipwrecked (2011), and Alvin and the Chipmunks: The Road Chip (2015).

Plot

A fir tree housing talking chipmunk brothers Alvin, Simon, and Theodore is cut down and driven to Los Angeles after JETT Records purchases it as a Christmas tree. Struggling songwriter and composer David Seville has his latest demo rejected by their chief executive, Ian Hawke, his college roommate, who suggests that Dave give up writing songs. The Chipmunks hop into a basket of muffins that Dave stole from one of Ian's coworkers and follow Dave home.

Once there, Dave discovers the Chipmunks and kicks them out of the house, only to hear them sing "Only You (And You Alone)" and "Funkytown." Dave then makes a deal with the Chipmunks to sing songs he writes in exchange for shelter. Later, when Dave tries to present the Chipmunks to Ian, they fail to sing because of stage fright. The day worsens as Dave is dismissed from his advertising job due to the Chipmunks having unknowingly ruined his presentation boards by drawing and writing on them. While hosting dinner with former girlfriend Claire, Dave struggles to hide the Chipmunks after Alvin attempts to create a romantic atmosphere, making Claire uncomfortable and causing her to leave. To make it up to him, the Chipmunks go to Ian's lavish mansion, where they sing Dave's song to him, prompting Ian to sign a record deal.

The Chipmunks quickly become an international success. When Dave, concerned for their well-being, insists that the Chipmunks are too young to handle fame, Ian convinces them that Dave is holding them back. After a misunderstanding, the Chipmunks choose to live with Ian, whose only interest is profiting off the Chipmunks’ success as they set off on a nationwide coast-to-coast tour, where Ian exploits their naïveté by overworking them constantly. When Ian's plan is revealed on the news, Dave decides to infiltrate their concert at the Orpheum Theatre to take them back.

Before their tour can begin, a veterinarian explains to Ian that the Chipmunks' voices have been worn out due to exhaustion and suggests that they take a long rest, but Ian, unwilling to issue refunds, advises the Chipmunks to lip-sync. Dave sneaks into the concert with help from Claire; the Chipmunks hear Dave calling and realizing that Ian has tricked them, they decide to sabotage the show by causing chaos onstage. Dave is stopped by security, and Ian catches the Chipmunks, locks them in a cage, and prepares to take them on their world tour. Dave tries to convince Ian to let the Chipmunks go by saying they need a real life but Ian refuses. He then escapes in his limousine with Dave in pursuit. When he loses Ian, the Chipmunks unexpectedly show up in his car. As Dave and the Chipmunks reconcile, Ian uncovers the escape, which costs him both his career and his fortune.

Cast

Live-action cast
 Jason Lee as David "Dave" Seville, a struggling songwriter and father figure to Alvin, Simon and Theodore 
 David Cross as Ian Hawke, the CEO of JETT Records
 Cameron Richardson as Claire Wilson, a photographer and Dave's ex-girlfriend
 Jane Lynch as Gail, an advertising executive and Dave's former boss

Voice cast
 Justin Long as Alvin
 Matthew Gray Gubler as Simon
 Jesse McCartney as Theodore
Additionally, Kevin Symons appears as Ted, Frank Maharajh appears as Barry, and Veronica Alicino appears as Amy, Dave's three former coworkers.

Production

Development 
Ross Bagdasarian Jr., the son of Alvin and the Chipmunks creator Ross Bagdasarian Sr. who revived the franchise after his father's death, dreamed of making a live-action Alvin film since 1997, "and the dream has had many nightmare moments." On September 17, 2004, Fox 2000 Pictures, 20th Century Fox Animation and Bagdasarian Productions announced they would collaborate to create a live-action computer-generated film starring Alvin and the Chipmunks. On April 17, 2005, Jon Vitti was revealed to be writing the screenplay. On January 24, 2007, it was announced Tim Hill was in talks with Fox to direct the film.

Casting 
Chevy Chase, Jim Carrey, Tim Allen, John Travolta, Ben Stiller, Vince Vaughn, and Bill Murray were originally considered for the role of David Seville. On March 7, 2007, Jason Lee joined the project to play David Seville, and Cameron Richardson signed on March 21. David was a more clean-cut character for Lee than his past roles, which he appreciated. Patton Oswalt and Brian Posehn were approached to play Ian Hawke but both of whom declined.

Bagdasarian and his wife, Janice Karman, had always voiced the chipmunks since they revived the franchise; however, for the film, they were replaced by Justin Long, Matthew Gray Gubler and Jesse McCartney for marketing reasons, despite the fact that for the first trailer of the film, Bagdasarian and Karman voiced the chipmunks.

For recording, the chipmunk voice actors spoke their lines slowly to be sped up to normal speed in post-production; McCartney described it as a "tedious process," where "it could take 40 takes for one line." He was such an Alvin and the Chipmunks fan that he even owned the album Chipmunk Punk (1980), and studied 1980s Alvin cartoons for his role in the film.

Filming 
Principal photography began on March 28, 2007, making it the first film to be produced under the leadership of Fox Animation president Vanessa Morrison. Seville's house was built on Sunset Gower Studios and contains references to Bagdasarian Sr.'s life. The set pieces included an upright piano he used to write his songs and a flower visual he painted; the house's address number includes 1958, the year he created the chipmunk characters; and the house design is based on a cottage built in 1919, the year Bagdasarian Sr. was born. In shots where Lee interacted with the chipmunks, the actor rehearsed with small stuffed animals indicating where the chipmunks would be; the animals were then removed when it was time to shoot, and he used his memory of where the animals were.

Visual-effects 
The Chipmunks were animated by Rhythm and Hues Studios, a company that previously animated creatures for projects such as Mouse Hunt (1997); Scooby-Doo (2002); The Cat in the Hat (2003); The Chronicles of Narnia: The Lion, the Witch and the Wardrobe (2005); and Babe (1995), the latter of which garnered Rhythm & Hues an Academy Award. As with all of its past projects, Rhythm & Hues used its own software for animating Alvin and the Chipmunks, such as Voodoo and Icy, which was used for placing the CGI into live-action shots; although Autodesk programs like Flame and Maya were used.

According to Bagdasarian Jr., getting the look of the chipmunks suited for a live-action setting while maintaining the essence of the cartoon designs was challenging, and it took until September 10, 2006, for the artists to get it right. Hill instructed the artists to make the chipmunks look realistic, but not entirely like chipmunks. In addition to observing real chipmunks offered by Universal Studios, Rhythm and Hues studied all versions of the chipmunk characters from past Alvin media for conceiving, fur-texturing, and animating designs for the film. Human dancers were referenced for animating the dance movements of the chipmunks, and YouTube videos of famous guitarists playing the guitar influenced how Alvin's guitar-playing was animated. High-dynamic-range images of sets were also used for lighting the chipmunks to fit the live-action shots. The most difficult part of integrating the CGI critters in the live-action shots was match moving for instances when they climb on Seville's head. For scenes where the chipmunks interacted with props, some of them were live-action props while others, such as a paper airplane, were produced and animated with computers.

Music

Soundtrack

The soundtrack was released November 20, 2007, three weeks before the film's opening, and contains new versions of old songs such as "Witch Doctor" and "The Chipmunk Song (Christmas, Don't Be Late)" (as made famous by David Seville and the Chipmunks), cover versions of songs such as "Bad Day" (as made famous by Daniel Powter) and "Funkytown" (as made famous by Lipps Inc.) and new songs such as "Coast 2 Coast", "Get You Goin'" and "Get Munk'd". The second track on the album is "The Chipmunk Song (Christmas Don't Be Late)", a remake version, without Jason Lee as the voice of Dave. However, the seventh track, the rock version of the song, features Lee as the voice of Dave. The soundtrack is the first album to be released in three years by Bagdasarian Productions, and is the group's 43rd album overall. Four songs from the album have charted on the Billboard Hot 100.

The album has been certified Platinum by the Recording Industry Association of America for shipments of over one million copies.

Reception

In December 2007, the album debuted at number 133 on the Billboard 200. In its second week of sales, the album jumped to number 67 on the chart.

The album's highest peak was number 5 on the Billboard 200, making it the group's highest on the chart album since Chipmunks in Low Places (which peaked at number 21). Following Alvin and the Chipmunk DVD release, the soundtrack went back into the top ten from number 16 to number five with a 111% sales increase; it sold 51,000 copies of what was its 18th week on the chart, and was the issue's greatest gainer.

The album has been certified Platinum by the RIAA and has sold over 1,000,000 copies in the United States. By doing this, the album has become the group's first RIAA-certified album since Chipmunks in Low Places (which also went Platinum). Alvin and the Chipmunks: Original Motion Picture Soundtrack has become the Chipmunks' third Platinum album and sixth RIAA-certified album total.

Songs
Four songs from the album managed to chart on the Billboard Hot 100 during the month of December 2007. They became the group's first charting songs in 47 years ("Alvin for President" had been the last charting single for the group, it peaked at number 95 in 1960). None of the songs were released as singles or ever solicited to mainstream radio (although it is possible that kid-oriented radio stations, such as Radio Disney, might have played them anyway); they charted solely because of high digital downloads.

The four songs that charted on the Billboard Hot 100 and/or the Hot Digital Songs chart were:

Track listing
A soundtrack sampler was released along with the DVD of the film in a two-pack sold exclusively at Walmart. This features five songs produced exclusively for the soundtrack.

 1Denotes original song.
 2Performed by Ross Bagdasarian, Sr. as David Seville. This version is technically without the Chipmunks.
 3Featuring Ross Bagdasarian, Sr. as David Seville (speaking only) and the singing voice for Alvin, Simon and Theodore.

Personnel
 Ross Bagdasarian Jr. — lead guitars and the spoken voice of Dave on track 2 and the sung vocal of Alvin
 Steve Vining — bass on track 8 and the sung vocal of Simon
 Janice Karman — the sung vocal of Theodore
 Jason Lee — spoken voiceover on track 7 (as "David Seville")
 Justin Long - spoken voiceover on tracks 7 (as "Alvin")
 Matthew Gray Gubler — spoken voiceover on tracks 7 (as "Simon")
 Jesse McCartney — spoken voiceover on tracks 7 (as "Theodore")
 Jason Gleed — guest vocals and rhythm guitars
 Chris Classic — secondary guest lead vocals
 Rebecca Jones — tertiary guest lead vocals
 Ali Dee Theodore — keyboards, bass (except track 8) and drum programming
 Alana Da Fonseca — uncharacterized backing vocals
 Joey Katsaros — manipulation of original concept album samples and uncharacterized backing vocals
 Zach Danziger — live drums and uncharacterized backing vocals
 Vinny Alfieri — uncharacterized backing vocals
 Andy Richards — string synthesizer on track 4, piano on track 8
 Ross Bagdasarian Sr. — piano on track 15, the singing voice of Dave on track 15, and the spoken voice of Dave, as well as singing voices for Alvin, Simon, and Theodore on track 16
 Aaron Sandlofer —keyboards, bass, guitar, drums & uncharacterized backing vocals

Charts

Score album
The film's original score was composed and conducted by Christopher Lennertz, a fan of the Chipmunks since childhood. La-La Land Records released a limited edition album on September 19, 2008.
 Main Title (1:07)
 I'm Late (:40)
 Ever? (2:07)
 Dave's Theme (:48)
 No More Nuts/Storing Food for the Winter (4:43)
 Rescue the Gear/Toaster Waffles (1:44)
 Leave Me Alone (2:17)
 I'll Clean Out My Office (1:35)
 Are You Awake? (1:13)
 Christmas Morning (4:09)
 Live with Uncle Ian (2:36)
 Dinner! (2:07)
 Dave Remembers/Missing the Boys (1:08)
 Get Them! (1:03)
 Dave's Phone Call (1:06)
 Theodore's Nightmare (1:05)
 I Want to Go Home (1:28)
 Alvin!!!/You'll Never Take Us Alive (4:09)

Release

Marketing
The first poster for Alvin and the Chipmunks was revealed online on July 4, 2007. Later that month, Fox launched the official website for Alvin and the Chipmunks with only a trailer and synopsis; Several games were added later on. In an August 2007 survey of 750 American teens ran by eCRUSH and OTX, Alvin and the Chipmunks, alongside Saw IV, National Treasure: Book of Secrets, Mama's Boy, Fred Claus, I Am Legend, and Enchanted, were the most anticipated films of the 2007 fall and winter seasons in the group.

Reception

Predictions 
Months before its release, bloggers predicted Alvin and the Chipmunks to be terrible because of the involvement of the director of Garfield: A Tail of Two Kitties (2006); the writers of Snow Day, the Ice Age films, Robots (2005) and Big Momma's House 2 (2006); and the poor quality of previous live-action adaptations of old cartoons.

Critical response 
Rotten Tomatoes reported that "critics say this may be the weakest vehicle for the helium-voiced rodents yet," elaborating, "the pundits say despite a few laughs, this is pretty bland stuff: dated, weakly constructed, and lacking in three-dimensional characters of the human or CGI variety." , on Rotten Tomatoes the film had an approval rating of 28% based on 109 reviews and an average score of 4.52/10. The site's critical consensus reads, "Though cutely rendered, Alvin and the Chipmunks suffers from bland potty humor and a rehashed kids' movie formula." , on Metacritic the film had a weighted average score of 39 out of 100 based on reviews from 23 critics. Audiences polled by CinemaScore gave it grade A, on a scale of A+ to F.

Ty Burr of the Boston Globe said, "the script leans heavily on the pranks and big-eyed cuteness of the li'l guys and leaves the live actors with unfunny dialogue and nothing to do." According to The New York Times, "its animated protagonists are egregiously eclipsed by the live-action characters." Chicago Reader criticized the "cardboard" characters of David Seville and Ian Hawke. The most common censure was the film's satire on commercialism, which was hypocritical due to being bombarded with popular brands, including the chipmunks themselves. Explained Burr, the film's message "is torn between the glitz that sells and the homilies that endure."

Some critics disliked Lee's under-acting, particularly his underwhelming yelling of the word "Alvin!" In Premiere's view, "Jason Lee makes for a sympathetic Dave, yet there's an almost somnambulistic quality to his performance," and Vice wrote that Lee's "rather 'cartoony' acting style here leaves a lot to be desired." However, Lee's acting did have some supporters for working as a likable protagonist, such as Time Out, a source that thought his "wry approach lends an edge to some of the script’s wittier moments." Some reviewers praised Cross' performance, such as Bill Goodykoontz of The Arizona Republic who called the villain the highlight of the film: "Cross is hilarious in everything he does, but he's surprisingly effective in a kids comedy. His villainy is so broad that it's never really scary, and he's so funny that you never tire of seeing him on-screen." However, one reviewer, Tim Robey, admitted to being annoyed by Cross in the film. Premiere called Richardson "sufficiently adorable and winsome, though the film's purity makes it difficult to imagine any sort of romantic entanglement." Wrote Roger Ebert, "Jason Lee and David Cross manfully play roles that require them, as actors, to relate with empty space that would later be filled with CGI."

The Philadelphia Inquirer wrote, "the values and the CGI are good." Some critics praised the chipmunk protagonists; with Vice writing they were "integrated pretty well into the live-action elements." The A.V. Club wrote, "the manic Chipmunks wear out their welcome pretty quickly." The Globe and Mail also commented on the shot composition: "you've got regulation-height dancers and musicians backing a singing group the size of kids' mittens." "As rendered here by the average-looking CGI effects, the characters are underwhelming in their appeal, lacking the charm of their previous animated incarnations," summarized The Hollywood Reporter. Some reviewers, including Ebert, also panned the lack of distinction between the chipmunks. However, Variety thought there was a "persuasive interaction of human and digital co-stars."

Accolades 

Fox submitted Alvin and the Chipmunks to the Academy Awards for a Best Animated Feature before the film had a theatrical run required for the award; it wasn't nominated. Upon the announcement of the submitted films, Brad Brevet of ComingSoon.net questioned the submission of a live-action/animated film like Alvin: "I mean, why wouldn’t Transformers then be considered animated?" While the Movieguide Awards named Alvin and the Chipmunks the third best family film of 2007, PopMatters called it the second worst film of the year. It was also named one of 2007's worst pictures by science fiction writer John Varley. In 2011, Entertainment Weekly ranked Alvin and the Chipmunks the third worst live-action/animation hybrid film of all-time. In terms of lists regarding the worst talking animal films of all time, both Complex and Screen Rant named it eleventh worst. In 2013, it was ranked by GamesRadar the 48th worst Christmas movie ever. In 2016, Box Office Prophets ranked it the fifth worst live-action film based on a cartoon. The film also won a Kids' Choice Award for Favorite Movie, a BMI Film & TV Award for Film Music, and was nominated for a Young Artist Award for Best Family Feature Film (Fantasy or Musical).

Response towards Cross 

Cross' appearance in Alvin and the Chipmunks was negatively received by fans of the comedian, The New York Observer reporting blog comments that called him a "smug, condescending asshole" and "a huge prick." On December 10, 2007, comedian Patton Oswalt published a writing on his MySpace blog titled "Godawful/Thank God," where he revealed he and Brian Posehn were approached for the part of Ian for Alvin and the Chipmunks; he made the following remark in the post: "We both threw the script across the room in disgust. David Cross caught it."

All of this prompted Cross to publicly discuss his involvement with the film on his website The Bob and Davider on December 31, 2007. He explained that he actually was offered the role before the casting team approached Oswalt and Posehn, but rejected. He got the offer again after six months of failing to find acting work and having a down payment on a cottage in the middle of Sullivan County, New York due; this time, he accepted the role out of desperation. He also admitted in the post he never saw the film, and hoped that his post "hopefully lessens some of the sense that I'm some kind of whore sell-out who doesn't care about anything but making money." The post only garnered more bad comments on blog stories about it: a Defamer reader commented that it was "the shittiest fucking defense since the Nuremberg trials," an A.V. Club user stated that "he's digging his own grave, professionally," and a Stereogum reader thought he "wouldn’t mind if [Cross] dies."

Oswalt responded to the post via The A.V. Club on January 2, 2008. He revealed that the comment towards Cross was nothing more than a "snide, private in-joke between us" that referenced a comment Cross made at a party in New York in March 2006; Cross had just received the script for Failure to Launch and stated, "Man, they sent me that script, and I read ten pages and threw it across the room." He called blog comments that responded to Cross' writing "very entertaining," but also concluded, "I don't care what any of my friends – or, for that matter, enemies – does to pay the bills. I think my role in this is finished, so it's up to someone else to mention your massive cash donations to Operation Rescue, or your upcoming tour with Toby Keith."

When it came to responses from professional writers towards Cross' behavior in the debacle, Jeff Bergstrom of BrooklynVegan opined that "no explanation was needed; a person needs work. And to be honest, I found his 5 part response to be a mega-invaluable resource for learning what Cross has been up to these days." Gawker stated the post "will effectively quash any burgeoning feud between two of our favorite comedians—especially since Cross demonstrated the above-referenced respect for his Pixar-blessed peer by not noting Oswalt's longtime involvement in King of Queens." C. Robert Cargill, on the other hand, thought that while Cross gave "pretty good reasons" in his post, "he forgot that he could drop some really biting sarcasm in the place of a 1000-word diatribe" and "lost" in responding to Oswalt.

Playlist was very harsh, calling Cross' post an "extremely lengthy and tedious defense" and that "at least Jason Lee had the good sense to take the pay check and shut the fuck up." Writing for The A.V. Club, Steve Hyden called Cross' blog post a "snide, dishonest, and largely unsuccessful attempt" to deflect the harsh responses thrown at him. He cited similar public statements Cross made when involved in previous projects, such as when he discussed being in the Law & Order: Criminal Intent episode "Bombshell" with Time Out Chicago; he elaborated, "Even at his funniest Cross is distant, cold, untouchable; he either can't admit to the occasional lame moment in his own life or he honestly believes he's above the foibles the rest of us idiots are guilty of every day."
 
A week after Cross-published on his blog, The New York Observer interviewed him and reported that he "seemed genuinely hurt by the criticism he was being subjected to online." Cross stated while being interviewed:

In 2014, Flavorwire named Oswalt's snide remark in the MySpace blog the 30th harshest comedian-on-comedian insult of all time.

Box office 
Alvin and the Chipmunks was released in North America on December 14, 2007. The film grossed $44.3 million in 3,475 theaters its opening weekend averaging to about $12,750 per venue, and placing second at the box office behind I Am Legend. Its second weekend was $28.2 million, behind National Treasure: Book of Secrets and I Am Legend. On its third weekend, it surpassed I Am Legend for number 2 at the box office, but still ranked behind National Treasure: Book of Secrets. The film closed on Thursday June 5, 2008, making $217.3 million in the US and $144 million overseas for a total of $361.3 million worldwide. The sustained box-office success surprised the studio; Elizabeth Gabler of Fox 2000 told the Los Angeles Times, "I look at the numbers every day, and we just laugh". Given its $60 million budget, Alvin was far more profitable than either I Am Legend or National Treasure: Book of Secrets. According to MTV, it also became the highest-grossing talking animal/cartoon adaptation until its sequel. It is also 20th Century Fox's highest-grossing film in the US to be released in 2007.

Home media

Alvin and the Chipmunks was released in DVD in North America, Greece, and Mexico on April 1, 2008; Hong Kong on April 10, 2008; the United Kingdom on April 14, 2008; and Taiwan on November 24, 2008. On Blu-ray, the film was issued in the United States on April 1, 2008; Portugal, South Africa, and the United Kingdom on April 14, 2008, Germany on April 25, 2008; Australia on June 18, 2008; Norway and Sweden on July 2, 2008; South Korea on July 7, 2008; Brazil on July 10, 2008; Finland on July 11, 2008; Hong Kong on July 18, 2008; Taiwan on August 8, 2008; France on November 19, 2008; Denmark on December 19, 2009; Canada on March 29, 2011; Mexico on October 16, 2011; and Spain on November 16, 2011. Also on April 1, 2008, a Blu-ray "gift set" that included dolls of all the three chipmunks alongside the movie was released. On Amazon Prime, the film was originally released in standard definition on March 30, 2010, before being issued in HD on September 18, 2012; and it was made available on Movies Anywhere on October 12, 2017.

Video game

The video game for this film was released December 4, 2007 for the Wii, Nintendo DS, PlayStation 2, and the PC. It was written and produced by DeeTown Entertainment.

Sequels

A sequel, titled Alvin and the Chipmunks: The Squeakquel, was released on December 23, 2009. Zachary Levi joined the cast to replace Jason Lee due to his small role and because of his role on My Name Is Earl; the main cast members reprised their roles for the sequel and the film also re-introduced the Chipettes. A third film, titled Alvin and the Chipmunks: Chipwrecked, was released on December 16, 2011. A fourth and final film, titled Alvin and the Chipmunks: The Road Chip, was released on December 18, 2015.

Notes

References

External links
 
 
 
 
 

2007 films
2007 fantasy films
2000s musical comedy films
American films with live action and animation
American children's animated comedy films
American Christmas films
American fantasy comedy films
American musical comedy films
2000s English-language films
Alvin and the Chipmunks films
Jukebox musical films
Films set in Los Angeles
Films shot in California
Live-action films based on animated series
20th Century Fox films
Regency Enterprises films
Dune Entertainment films
Films directed by Tim Hill
Films scored by Christopher Lennertz
2007 comedy films
Films produced by Ross Bagdasarian Jr.
Films produced by Janice Karman
2000s American films